Warband may refer to:

 A local warrior society
 The ancient and medieval Germanic comitatus
 Mount & Blade: Warband, an standalone expansion for the video game Mount & Blade